Ad-Dilam (Arabic: الدلم) is a city in Riyadh Region, Saudi Arabia. As of 2010, The city has 40 114 inhabitants.  
   
It was the site of the Battle of Dilam in 1903.

See also 

 List of cities and towns in Saudi Arabia

References

Riyadh Province